Serra dos Aimorés ("Botocudo mountain") is a mountainous area in eastern Brazil straddling the border between Espírito Santo and Minas Gerais. Its name derives from the Aimoré, an indigenous people who used to inhabit the area.

Aimores